Vinicius Xavier da Purificação Moutinho (born 17 July 2000), commonly known as Foguinho, is a Brazilian professional footballer who plays as an attacking midfielder for EC Vitória, on loan from Chapecoense.

Club career
Born in Ouro Preto, Minas Gerais, Foguinho represented Cruzeiro, Guarani, Juventus-SP, Botafogo and Chapecoense as a youth. After impressing with the latter in the 2020 Copa São Paulo de Futebol Júnior, he was promoted to the first team and renewed his contract until 2023 on 13 February 2020.

Foguinho made his first team debut on 15 February 2020, in a 1–1 Campeonato Catarinense home draw against Criciúma; after coming on as a second-half substitute for Yann Rolim, he scored the equalizer after 14 minutes on the pitch.

Career statistics

References

External links
 
 Chapecoense profile 

2000 births
Living people
People from Ouro Preto
Brazilian footballers
Association football midfielders
Campeonato Brasileiro Série A players
Campeonato Brasileiro Série B players
Associação Chapecoense de Futebol players
Brusque Futebol Clube players
Sportspeople from Minas Gerais